American jazz saxophonist John Coltrane recorded several sessions in his lifetime as both a sideman and a bandleader.

Recording Sessions
Coltrane